Youthquake is the second studio album by the English pop band Dead or Alive, released on 3 May 1985 by Epic Records. The album was their commercial breakthrough in Europe and the United States, due to the lead single "You Spin Me Round (Like a Record)", which was a UK number-one hit and a top 20 hit in the United States.  Additional single releases from the album included "Lover Come Back to Me", "In Too Deep" and "My Heart Goes Bang (Get Me to the Doctor)". 

This was Dead or Alive's first collaboration with the Stock Aitken Waterman production team. The Recording was marked by tension and clashes between band and producers, which engineer Phil Harding alleges almost escalated to violence. Youthquake was re-released in the UK on compact disc in 1994, with the two bonus tracks that were previously included on the original CD and cassette versions of the album.

Recent US and Japanese reissues have reverted to the original vinyl track listing.

The album peaked at No. 9 in the UK and was certified gold by the British Phonographic Industry (BPI) for sales of over 100,000 copies. It also peaked at No. 31 in the US and was certified gold by the Recording Industry Association of America (RIAA) for sales over 500,000. In Canada, the album peaked at No. 8 and was certified platinum.

The album cover was taken by Peruvian fashion and portrait photographer, Mario Testino.

Track listing

 Original vinyl, original US CD, and original Japan CD release is 9 tracks only, omitting tracks 6 (remix) and 11 (extended mix)

Personnel
Dead or Alive
 Pete Burns – lead and backing vocals
 Mike Percy – synthesizers and electric guitar
 Tim Lever – synthesizers, sequencer, sampler, electric guitar and backing vocals
 Steve Coy – drum machines and backing vocals

Production and artwork
 Mike Stock – producer
 Pete Waterman – producer
 Matt Aitken – producer
 Phil Harding – engineer; mixing
 Satori – design
 Mario Testino – photography

Chart performance

Certifications

Notes

References

External links
 

1985 albums
Dead or Alive (band) albums
Albums produced by Stock Aitken Waterman
Epic Records albums